Tortricidiosis is a genus of moths belonging to the family Tortricidae and unassigned to any subfamily or tribe.

Species
Tortricidiosis inclusa Skalski, 1973

See also
List of Tortricidae genera

References

External links
tortricidae.com

Tortricidae genera
Tortricidae